Brave Search is a search engine developed by Brave Software, Inc., which is set as the default search engine for Brave web browser users in certain countries.

History

Brave Search is a search engine developed by Brave Software, Inc. and released in Beta in March 2021, following the acquisition of Tailcat, a privacy-focused search engine from Cliqz. Brave Search aims to use its independent index to generate search results. However, the user can allow the Brave browser to anonymously check Google for the same query.

Brave Search claims it will eventually offer ad-supported free search as well as ad-free paid search options. It hopes to explore bringing BAT revenue sharing to these ads in a similar fashion to the Brave ads platform.

In October 2021, Brave Search was made the default search engine for Brave browser users in the United States, Canada, United Kingdom (replacing Google Search), France (replacing Qwant) and Germany (replacing DuckDuckGo).

In June 2022, Brave Search ended its beta stage and was fully released. In addition to the launch, the new Goggles feature was added allowing users to apply their own rules and filters to search queries.

Features 

Brave search has various features designed to enhance users' searching experience:

 Brave Search uses its own web index. As of May 2022, it covered over 10 billion pages and was used to serve 92% of search results without relying on any third-parties, with the remainder being retrieved server-side from the Bing API or (on an opt-in basis) client-side from Google. According to Brave, the index was kept "intentionally smaller than that of Google or Bing" in order to help avoid spam and other low-quality content, with the disadvantage that "Brave Search is not yet as good as Google in recovering long-tail queries." 
 Brave Search Premium: users can optionally create an account with Brave Search Premium to support Brave Search directly with providing independent and unbiased search results. Brave Search is currently an ad-free website, but it will eventually switch to a new model that will include ads and premium users will get an ad-free experience.
 Opt-in data collection: user data including IP addresses are not collected from its users by default. A premium account is required for opt-in data-collection.
 Discussions: a feature that shows conversations related to the search query, such as comments on the website Reddit. When a user searches and scrolls down, if available a discussions section will be there, and it will contain various forums where and the user can click one to see an answer from a user from an online community.
 Goggles: a feature that allows users to apply their own rules and filters to a search.
 Summarizer: an AI-powered summarization feature powered by Brave's AI.

Data collection 

Brave search does implement some level of data-collection, but only when users opt-in. This is done through the Web Discovery Project (WDP). The project is a methodology and system developed by Brave Software, Inc. to collect data generated by their users while protecting their privacy and anonymity. Users can opt in at any time while using the search engine by modifying the settings, no account is required for this function. As of 2022, data from the WDP was used to inform the ranking of search results.

References

External links 
 Brave Search

Internet search engines
Internet privacy software